Phyllonorycter medicaginella is a moth of the family Gracillariidae. It is found from Denmark and Poland to Belgium, the Alps, Bulgaria and Ukraine.

The larvae feed on Medicago falcata, Medicago lupulina, Medicago sativa, Melilotus alba, Melilotus officinalis, Ononis spinosa, Trifolium dubium, Trifolium campestre and Trifolium repens. They mine the leaves of their host plant. They create a lower-surface tentiform mine that occupies an entire leaflet. Fully developed mines are strongly inflated and the leaflet is folded so closely that the mine is almost invisible from below. In this stage the larva has eaten all parenchyma above the mine, giving the mine a white colour. The pupa seems to lie freely in the cocoon without a cocoon, but the cocoon is in fact part of the inner lining of the mine. The frass is deposited in a clump in a corner of the mine, separated from the pupa by a partition.

References

medicaginella
Moths of Europe
Moths described in 1930